Rocky Point is a census-designated place and unincorporated community in southern Pender County, North Carolina, United States. It is part of the Wilmington Metropolitan Statistical Area. Rocky Point is situated on North Carolina Highway 210, North Carolina Highway 133 and U.S. Route 117, at an elevation of 39 feet (12 m).  The ZIP Code for Rocky Point is 28457.

Overview
Rocky Point is located at exit 408 off of Interstate 40. Rocky Point is just a two-stop-light town (three, counting the one off  I-40). The community is growing fairly rapidly. Land taxes are low, and the community is served by the Rocky Point Fire Department, Pender EMS and Fire, and the Pender County Sheriff's Office. The community, although very rural, is situated just 15–20 miles from the Atlantic Ocean, with Wrightsville Beach being the nearest public beach. Notably, it is also the home of beloved small town restaurant, Paul's Place Famous Hot Dogs.

History 
Rocky Point has been around since Colonial America, but did not get its name until 1875. Fertile soil has been favored in Rocky Point by farmers for the past 200 years for being so good for growing healthy crops. Plantations with slaves were fairly common up until the Civil War. The name of Rocky Point is not fully known but it is because of the local Miningquarry or digging to deepen the Cape Fear River and the piles/ hills of rock left over

Schools 

 Rocky Point Elementary School
 Cape Fear Elementary School 
 Cape Fear Middle School 

 Heide Trask High School

School system 
Rocky point schools are in the Pender County schools district with the chairperson of the board of education being Ken Smith.

Past Schools 
 Long Creek High School (1924-1993)
 PCTS(1929-1969)
 Rocky Point school(1925-1943)

Notable people
John Baptista Ashe, former U.S. Representative for Tennessee
William Shepperd Ashe, former U.S. Representative
Richard Brickhouse - A NASCAR driver who won the inaugural Talladega 500 in 1969

References

Unincorporated communities in North Carolina
Census-designated places in Pender County, North Carolina
Cape Fear (region)